Grandview station is a flag stop located in Grandview, Manitoba, Canada.  The station is served by Via Rail's Winnipeg – Churchill train.

Footnotes 

Via Rail stations in Manitoba